The Walt Disney World Dolphin is a resort hotel located between Epcot and Disney's Hollywood Studios in the Walt Disney World Resort in Bay Lake, Florida. It is the sister resort of the Walt Disney World Swan. Both hotels were designed by Michael Graves. The Dolphin opened on June 4, 1990, as part of a joint venture between the Walt Disney Company, Tishman Hotel Corporation, MetLife and Starwood Hotels and Resorts, which was merged into Marriott International in 2019. The land the resort occupies is owned by the Walt Disney Company, while the buildings themselves are leased by Disney to the Tishman Hotel Corporation and MetLife but operated by Marriott International under the Sheraton Hotels and Resorts brand. The Walt Disney World Swan and Dolphin are a part of the Walt Disney Collection of resorts; because of this they are Disney branded and guests of the resort have access to special Disney benefits available to Disney Resort Hotel guests only.

The Dolphin and Swan share similar elements, but each has a distinctive appearance. On the main colored facade there is a turquoise banana-leaf pattern echoed by a similar wave pattern on the Swan.

 The statues on top of the Dolphin hotel are not mammalian dolphins, but a stylised version of a nautical dolphin, a common symbol used on old world nautical maps. The design of the creatures is based on Triton Fountain in Rome.

In 2008, The Walt Disney Dolphin Resort was awarded a One Palm Designation through the Florida Green Lodging Program, established by the Florida Department of Environmental Protection.

Dining

Fine dining 
 Todd English's BlueZoo - Seafood
 Shula's Steak House - Steak and Seafood

Casual dining

 Cabana Bar and Beach Club - Poolside
 The Fountain - Food and Ice Cream Shop

Quick service 
Fuel - Snacks and Treats
 Picabu - Cafeteria Style Restaurant

Lounges 
Shula's Lounge
Todd English's Bluezoo Lounge
 Phins

History
In the late 1980s, Disney saw that they were losing business to area hotels that catered to conventions and large meetings, so Michael Eisner decided to build a convention-oriented hotel near Epcot. The Tishman Group, the contractor who was hired to build Epcot and who also had hotels in the nearby Disney hotel zone, claimed that the Epcot deal gave them exclusive rights to operate convention hotels on the Disney property, so Disney partnered with Tishman to develop the Swan and Dolphin complex. The Swan was managed by Westin Hotels & Resorts, and the Dolphin by Sheraton Hotels & Resorts. Eisner had used Graves for other company projects and wanted to continue to build striking, unique buildings.

Tishman and MetLife own the buildings, but have a 99-year lease on the land from Disney. Disney also receives a share of the hotel's revenues, and has a say in any design or architecture changes to the interior or exterior of the buildings.

Walt Disney World privileges

Walt Disney World Swan and Dolphin guests are provided complimentary transportation to all Walt Disney World theme parks and attractions on the Disney Transportation System, via boat (to Epcot and Disney's Hollywood Studios). Length-of-stay park passes are available, as is package delivery from Disney theme park shops to the resort. There is a Walt Disney World guest services desk located in the lobby of each resort. Walt Disney World Swan and Dolphin guests can also use Extra Magic Hours, and can make dining reservations 60 days prior to their arrival at the resort. However, room charging (using hotel key as a credit card at Walt Disney World) is not available and hotel restaurants only participate in the Tables in Wonderland Dining Plan, not the Disney Dining Plan. Room charging within the Walt Disney World Swan and Dolphin Resort Complex is available. Also, guests staying at the Walt Disney World Swan and Dolphin have free theme park parking and priority access to the Disney theme parks during sell out situations.

References

External links
 Walt Disney World Swan & Dolphin official website
 Walt Disney World Dolphin Resort page at Sheraton website
 Walt Disney World Dolphin Resort page at Walt Disney website

Hotels in Walt Disney World Resort
Hotel buildings completed in 1990
Sheraton hotels
Michael Graves buildings
Convention centers in Florida
Hotels established in 1990
1990 establishments in Florida